{{Infobox person
|name=Rick Polizzi
|birth_date=
|birth_place=New Orleans, Louisiana, U.S.
| |known_for=The SimpsonsSpin Again
|occupation=Producer
|spouse=Carla Myers Polizzi
|children=Hannah, Bryce
|footnotes=
}}

Rick Polizzi is an American television producer and author. He is the creator of the book Spin Again, animation producer on the successful television series The Simpsons, and creator of Los Angeles based Halloween haunt Boney Island.

Polizzi has won three Primetime Emmy Awards for The Simpsons.

Career

Early career
In the late 1970s, Polizzi began working in the film department of WWL-TV in New Orleans, Louisiana. He moved to Los Angeles, California in 1981 and soon after, graduated from The American Academy of Dramatic Arts.

Spin Again
As an avid collector of board games, Polizzi co-authored a book about vintage games titled Spin Again.Polizzi, Rick, and Fred Schaefer. Spin Again, Board Games From the Fifties and Sixties. San Francisco: Chronicle Books, 1991. 116-117.

The Simpsons

Polizzi began working on Fox Television's The Simpsons'' in 1996 as post-production supervisor. He became an Animation producer shortly after, and has been nominated for six Primetime Emmy Awards. He has won three.

Boney Island

Frustrated by the lack of family friendly Halloween attractions in the Los Angeles area, Polizzi began to construct a display of his own in the front lawn of his Sherman Oaks, California home. Boney Island was a show, set with a carnival theme, which was mostly composed of animated skeleton parts made from plastic. By the time Boney Island had its last showing in 2007, it had become a large success.

References

Further reading

 
 
 
 
.

.

External links

 
 Rick Polizzi on WikiSimpsons
 The Simpsons- a Norwegian/German success (in Norwegian)

1958 births
Living people
American television producers
American Academy of Dramatic Arts alumni
Writers from New Orleans
Primetime Emmy Award winners